Fred Wolf Films is an American animation studio founded in 1967 by Fred Wolf and  Jimmy T. Murakami. It was founded as MW (Murakami-Wolf). It later became known as Murakami-Wolf-Swenson (MWS) when Charles Swenson became a full partner in 1978. From 1989 to 2000, they also operated a subsidiary, Fred Wolf Films Dublin, located in Dublin, Ireland. It adopted its current name in 2013 following a reorganization.

The studio produced The Point, the first U.S. animated special to air in prime time (on the ABC network in 1971).  It was also responsible for Free to Be… You and Me, the Puff the Magic Dragon specials, and television series such as Teenage Mutant Ninja Turtles, Toxic Crusaders, James Bond Jr., The New Adventures of Speed Racer, and Sarah Ferguson's Budgie the Little Helicopter.

Film
 The Box (Academy Award winner) (1967) 
 The Magic Pear Tree (Academy Award nominee) (1968)
 200 Motels (produced by; Charles Swenson - Animation Director) (1971)
 Down and Dirty Duck (produced by; Charles Swenson - Director) (1974)
 The Mouse and His Child (1977)
 The Adventures of the American Rabbit (1986)
 Dragon and Slippers (1991) (dubbed)
 Snow White and the Magic Mirror (1994)
 Young Pocahontas (1995)

TV
TV films and specials
 The Point (A Murakami-Wolf Production; Fred Wolf - Director) (1971) ABC Movie of the Week
 Free to Be... You and Me (select animated segments)
 Puff the Magic Dragon (1978)
 Puff the Magic Dragon in the Land of the Living Lies (1979)
 Puff and the Incredible Mr. Nobody (1982)
 The Little Rascals Christmas Special (1979)
 Strawberry Shortcake TV specials (1st and 3rd ones only)
 Carlton Your Doorman (1980)
 Peter and the Magic Egg (1983)
 Mickey's 60th Birthday (1988)
 Rockin' Through the Decades (1990)
 Dragon and Slippers (1991) (dubbed)

TV Series
 Teenage Mutant Ninja Turtles (1987–1996)
 Little Clowns of Happytown (1987–1988) (co-production with Marvel Productions)
 The Chipmunks (1988–1989) (eleven episodes from the sixth season)
 The California Raisin Show (1989)
 Barnyard Commandos (1990)
 Toxic Crusaders (1991)
 James Bond Jr. (1991–1992) (co-production with Camelot Entertainment Sales, distributed by Claster Television, Inc. and Metro-Goldwyn-Mayer
 The New Adventures of Speed Racer (1993–1994)
 The Fantastic Voyages of Sinbad the Sailor (1996–1998) (distributed by Warner Bros. International Television)
 The New Adventures of Zorro (1997–1998)  (co-production with Harvest Entertainment, Zorro Productions, Inc. and Carrington Productions Incorporated, distributed by Warner Bros. International Television

Fred Wolf Films Dublin
TV
 Dino Babies (1994–1996)
 Budgie the Little Helicopter (1994–1996)

References

External links
Fred Wolf Films Dublin
Fred Wolf Films at IMDb
Murakami-Wolf-Swenson at IMDb
Murakami-Wolf Productions at IMDb
Fred Wolf Films at BCDB

Mass media companies established in 1965
American animation studios
Entertainment companies of Ireland
Mass media companies disestablished in 1999
Irish animation studios
Mass media companies established in 2013